Transcript may refer to:

 Transcript (biology), a molecule of RNA transcribed from DNA
 Transcript (education), a copy of a student's permanent academic record
 Transcript (law), a written record of spoken language in court proceedings
 Transcript (programming language), a computer programming language
 The Transcript, Ohio Wesleyan University's student-run newspaper
 "Transcript (Space Ghost Coast to Coast)", an episode of Space Ghost Coast to Coast

See also
 Transcription (disambiguation)